The Ambassador of France to Malaysia is the head of France's diplomatic mission to Malaysia, and the official representative of the Government of France to the Government of Malaysia. The position has the rank and status of an Ambassador Extraordinary and Plenipotentiary and is based in the Embassy of France, Kuala Lumpur.

The incumbent Ambassador is Mr. Roland Galharague who was appointed in December 2020.

History

France was one of 15 countries to establish formal diplomatic relations with the Federation of Malaya in 1957 soon after its independence.

List of heads of mission

Ambassadors of the Fourth Republic to Malaya

Ambassadors of the Fifth Republic to Malaya

Ambassadors of the Fifth Republic to Malaysia

See also 
 France-Malaysia relations

External links

References 

Malaysia
France
Ambassadors